Jarilla may refer to:

Jarilla (genus), a genus of plants in the family Caricaceae
 Jarilla, a Spanish language common name for plants in the genus Larrea
Jarilla, Cáceres, a municipality in the province of Cáceres, Extremadura, Spain
Jarilla, San Luis, a municipality in the province of San Luis in central Argentina